The  is a hybrid diesel multiple unit (DMU) train type operated by East Japan Railway Company (JR East) on Senseki-Tōhoku Line services in the Sendai area since 30 May 2015.

Design

Concept
The HB-E210 series trains were developed from the earlier KiHa E200 type operated on the rural Koumi Line, but to better suit commuter service operations, it incorporates both internal and external design elements from E129 series EMUs, like having three pairs of sliding doors per side and a mixture of transverse and longitudinal seating.

Hybrid diesel/battery operation cycle
Each car is equipped with a 331 kW 6-cylinder diesel engine and two banks of lithium-ion batteries with a capacity of 15.2 kWh when new. While at standstill, energy stored in the lithium-ion batteries is used to power auxiliary facilities on the train. On starting from standstill, energy stored in the batteries is used to drive the motors via an inverter, with the engine cut out. The engine then cuts in for further acceleration and running on gradients. When braking, the motor acts as a generator, recharging the batteries.

Livery
The exterior livery consists primarily of blue, the line colour for the Senseki Line, with pink highlights to evoke an image of the cherry blossom trees along the line, and smaller green highlights in JR East's corporate colour.

Bogies
Each car has one DT75B motored bogie (at the Sendai end) and one TR260B trailer bogie (at the Sekimaki end).

Operations

Formations
The HB-E210 series fleet consists of eight two-car sets (16 vehicles), formed as shown below, with the HB-E211 car at the Sendai (eastern) end of the train.

Interior
LED lighting is used throughout. The HB-E211 cars have a universal access toilet at the inner end, and the HB-E212 cars have priority seats at both sides on the inner end.

History

The first two trains built by Japan Transport Engineering Company (J-TREC) in Yokohama were originally scheduled to be delivered in November 2014, but the delivery date was postponed until January 2015.

In May 2016, the HB-E210 series was awarded the 2016 Laurel Prize, presented annually by the Japan Railfan Club.

Build details
The build histories of individual sets are as follows.

See also
 HB-E300 series, a similar hybrid DMU train type operated by JR East on resort train services
 YC1 series, a hybrid DMU train type operated by JR Kyushu from 2020

References

Further reading

External links

 JR East press release (2 July 2013) 

Hybrid multiple units of Japan
East Japan Railway Company
Train-related introductions in 2015
J-TREC multiple units